Donald McGillivray (December 2, 1838 – December 13, 1913) was a farmer, merchant and political figure in British Columbia. He represented New Westminster in the Legislative Assembly of British Columbia from 1878 to 1882.

He was born in Glengarry County, Ontario, the son of John McGillivray and Catherine Urquhart, was educated there and then moved with his family to New York City. In 1860, McGillivray came to British Columbia and worked for a time at the Puget Mill company in Port Gamble, Washington. Around 1863, he operated a pack train in the Cariboo District. McGillivray then sold his operation to the Western Union Telegraph Company. After that he was involved in farming, dairy and raising livestock, as well as operating as a general merchant in Chilliwack, until 1903 when he retired to Chillowack. In 1889, McGillivray was named postmaster for Sumas. He was also a lay preacher in the Methodist church. He served as a magistrate and justice of the peace for New Westminster district. McGillivray was married twice: first to Susan Hall in 1868 and then to Julia Andrews in 1881. He died in Chilliwack at the age of 75.

Electoral results

References 

1838 births
1913 deaths
Independent MLAs in British Columbia
Canadian Methodists